His Late Excellency is a 1927 German silent film directed by Adolf E. Licho and Wilhelm Thiele and starring Willy Fritsch, Olga Tschechowa, and Ernst Gronau.

The film's sets were designed by the art director Erich Czerwonski and Günther Hentschel.

Cast

References

Bibliography

External links

1927 films
Films of the Weimar Republic
German silent feature films
Films directed by Adolf E. Licho
Films directed by Wilhelm Thiele
German films based on plays
UFA GmbH films
German black-and-white films
Films with screenplays by Wilhelm Thiele
1920s German films